The Honey Drippers or The Honeydrippers may refer to:

The Honeydrippers, 1980s British-American rock band
The Honey Drippers, a soul band, led by Roy C, that recorded the 1973 song "Impeach the President"
Joe Liggins and his Honeydrippers, a jump band led by Joe Liggins, active during the 1940s and 1950s, that recorded the 1945 song "The Honeydripper"

See also
The Honeydrippers: Volume One, a 1984 EP by the rock band
 The Honeydripper (disambiguation)
 Honeydripper (film), a 2007 film by John Sayles